Adjara ( Ach’ara ) or Achara, officially known as the Autonomous Republic of Adjara ( Ach’aris Avt’onomiuri Resp’ublik’a ), is a political-administrative region of Georgia. Located in the country's southwestern corner, Adjara lies on the coast of the Black Sea near the foot of the Lesser Caucasus Mountains, north of Turkey. It is an important tourist destination and includes Georgia's second most populous city of Batumi as its capital. About 350,000 people live on its .

Adjara is home to the Adjarians, a regional subgroup of Georgians. The name can be spelled in a number of ways, including Ajara, Ajaria, Adjaria, Adzharia, Atchara and Achara. Under the Soviet Union, Adjara was part of the Georgian Soviet Socialist Republic as the Adjarian ASSR. The autonomous status of Adjara is guaranteed under article 6 of the Treaty of Kars.

History 

Adjara has been part of Colchis and Caucasian Iberia since ancient times. Colonized by Greeks in the 5th century BC, the region fell under Rome in the 2nd century BC. It became part of the Lazica before being incorporated into the Kingdom of Abkhazia in the 8th century AD, the latter led unification of Georgian monarchy in the 11th century.

The Ottomans conquered the area in 1614. The people of Adjara gradually converted to Islam in this period. The Ottomans were forced to cede Adjara to the expanding Russian Empire in 1878.

After a temporary occupation by Ottoman and British troops in 1918–1920, Adjara became part of the Democratic Republic of Georgia in 1920, and was granted autonomy under the Georgian constitution adopted in February 1921 when the Red Army invaded Georgia. After a brief military conflict in March 1921,  Ankara's government ceded the territory to Georgia under Article VI of Treaty of Kars on the condition that autonomy be provided for the Muslim population, while Turkish commodities were guaranteed free transit through the port of Batumi. The Soviets established in 1921 the Adjarian Autonomous Soviet Socialist Republic within the Georgian Soviet Socialist Republic in accord with this clause, thus Adjara remained part of Georgia. Until 1937 it had the name Ajaristan. The autonomous republic was the only Soviet autonomy based on religion rather than ethnicity.

Independent Georgia
After the dissolution of the Soviet Union in 1991, Adjara became part of a newly independent but politically divided Republic of Georgia. It avoided being dragged into the chaos and civil war that afflicted the rest of the country between 1991 and 1993, largely due to the authoritarian rule of Adjara's leader Aslan Abashidze. Although he successfully maintained order in Adjara and made it one of the country's most prosperous regions, he was accused of involvement in organised crime—notably large-scale smuggling to fund his government and enrich himself. The central government in Tbilisi had very little say in what went on in Adjara during the presidency of Eduard Shevardnadze.

This changed following the Rose Revolution of 2003 when Shevardnadze was deposed in favour of the reformist opposition leader Mikheil Saakashvili, who pledged to restore the country's territorial integrity and reunite it. Soon after his inauguration as president in January 2004 Saakashvili took aim at Abashidze. In spring 2004, a major crisis in Adjara erupted as the central government sought to reimpose its authority on the region. It threatened to develop into an armed confrontation. However, Saakashvili's ultimata and mass protests against Abashidze's autocratic rule forced the Adjaran leader to resign in May 2004, following which he went into exile in Russia. After Abashidze's ousting, a new law was introduced to redefine the terms of Adjara's autonomy. Levan Varshalomidze succeeded Abashidze as the chairman of the government.

In July 2007, the seat of the Georgian Constitutional Court was moved from Tbilisi to Batumi.

In November 2007 Russia ended its two century military presence in Georgia by withdrawing from the 12th Military Base (the former 145th Motor Rifle Division) in Batumi.

Turkey is a guarantor of Adjaran autonomy based on Article 6 of the Treaty of Kars, and currently has noticeable influence in Adjara, which can be seen in the region's economy and in the religious life—through the region's Muslim population.

Law and government 

The status of the Adjaran Autonomous Republic is defined by Georgia's law on Adjara and the region's new constitution, adopted following the ousting of Aslan Abashidze. The local legislative body is the Parliament. The head of the region's government—the Council of Ministers of Adjara—is nominated by the President of Georgia who also has powers to dissolve the assembly and government and to overrule local authorities on issues where the constitution of Georgia is contravened. Tornike Rizhvadze is the current head of the Adjaran government.

Administrative divisions 
Adjara is subdivided into six administrative units:

Geography and climate 

Adjara is located on the south-eastern coast of the Black Sea and extends into the wooded foothills and mountains of the Lesser Caucasus. It has borders with the region of Guria to the north, Samtskhe-Javakheti to the east and Turkey to the south. Most of Adjara's territory either consists of hills or mountains. Around 60% of Adjara is covered by forests. Many parts of the Meskheti Range (the west-facing slopes) are covered by temperate rain forests.

Adjara is traversed by the northeasterly line of equal latitude and longitude.

Climate

Adjara is well known for its humid climate (especially along the coastal regions) and prolonged rainy weather, although there is plentiful sunshine during the spring and summer months. Adjara receives the highest amounts of precipitation both in Georgia and in the Caucasus. It is also one of the wettest temperate regions in the northern hemisphere. The coastal lowlands receive most of the precipitation in the form of rain (due to the area's subtropical climate). September and October are usually the wettest months. The interior parts of Adjara are considerably drier than the coastal mountains and lowlands. Winter usually brings significant snowfall to the higher regions of Adjara, where snowfall often reaches several meters. Average summer temperatures are between 22–24 degrees Celsius in the lowland areas and 17–21 degrees Celsius in the highlands. The highest areas of Adjara have lower temperatures. Average winter temperatures are between 4–6 degrees Celsius along the coast while the interior areas and mountains average around -3–2 degrees Celsius. Some of the highest mountains of Adjara have average winter temperatures of -8–(-7) degrees Celsius.

Economy 

Adjara has good land for growing tea, citrus fruits and tobacco. Mountainous and forested, the region has a subtropical climate, and there are many health resorts. Tobacco, tea, citrus fruits, and avocados are leading crops; livestock raising is also important. Industries include tea packing, tobacco processing, fruit and fish canning, oil refining, and shipbuilding.

The regional capital, Batumi, is an important gateway for the shipment of goods heading into Georgia, Azerbaijan and landlocked Armenia. The port of Batumi is used for the shipment of oil from Kazakhstan and Turkmenistan. Its oil refinery handles Caspian oil from Azerbaijan which arrives by pipeline to Supsa port and is transported from there to Batumi by rail. The Adjaran capital is a centre for shipbuilding and manufacturing.

Adjara is the main center of Georgia's coastal tourism industry, having displaced the northwestern province of Abkhazia since that region's de facto secession from Georgia in 1993.

Demographics

Population 

According to the 2014 census, the population of Adjara is 333,953. The Adjarians (Ajars) are an ethnographic group of the Georgian people who speak a group of local dialects known collectively as Adjarian. The written language is Georgian.

The Georgian population of Adjara had been generally known as "Muslim Georgians" until the 1926 Soviet census which listed them as "Ajars" and counted 71,000 of them. Later, they were simply classified under a broader category of Georgians as no official Soviet census asked about religion. Today, calling them "Muslim Georgians" would be a misnomer in any case as Adjarans are nearly 55% Christian and nearly 40% Muslim (see below).

Ethnic minorities include Laz, Russians, Armenians, Pontic Greeks, Abkhaz, etc.

Religion 

The collapse of the Soviet Union and the re-establishment of Georgia's independence accelerated the growth of Christianity in the region, especially among the young. However, there still remains Sunni Muslim communities in Adjara, mainly in the Khulo district. According to the 2014 Georgian national census, 54.5% were Orthodox Christians, and 39.8% Muslim. The remaining were Armenian Christians (0.3%), and others (5.3%).

Traditional public festivals

Selimoba
Selimoba is held in the village of Bako, Khulo Municipality on July 3 and commemorates the life of Selim Khimshiashvili. A concert with the participation of local amateur groups of a folk handicraft products exhibition is held during the festival. It is supported by Ministry of Education, Culture and Sports of Adjara.

Shuamtoba
Shuamtoba ("inter-mountain festival") is a traditional festival, which is held on the summer mountain pastures of two municipalities (Khulo and Shuakhevi), during the first weekend of every August. Horse racing, a folk handicraft exhibition and a concert involving folk ensembles are held as well.

Machakhloba
Machakhloba is a Machakhela gorge festivity, held in the second half of September. It is a traditional holiday celebrated in Machakhela gorge, Khelvachauri Municipality.  The festival begins at the Machakhela rifle monument (at the point of convergence of the rivers Machakhela and Chorokhi), continues in the village Machakhispiri and ends in the village Zeda Chkhutuneti.

Kolkhoba
Kolkhoba is an ancient Laz festival. It is held at the end of August or at the beginning of September in Sarpi village, Khelvachauri District. The story of the Argonauts is performed on stage during the festival.

People 

 Tbeli Abuserisdze (1190–1240), a Georgian writer and scientist.
 Fyodor Yurchikhin (born 3 January 1959), cosmonaut.
 Sopho Khalvashi (born 31 May 1986), Georgian singer.
 Selim Khimshiashvili (3 June 1815), as Pasha (Minister) of Ottoman and Russia Political Affairs on 1802.
 Ahmed-Pasha Khimshiashvili (died 1836), Great Ottoman Pasha.
 Memed Abashidze (1873–1941), a prominent political leader of Muslim Georgians.
 Aslan Abashidze (born 1938), an ousted regional leader.
 Zurab Nogaideli (born 1964), former Prime Minister of Georgia (3 February 2005 – 16 November 2007).
 Levan Varshalomidze (born 1972), Head of the Adjarian Government, 2004–2012.

See also 

Former countries in Europe after 1815
Laz people
Merisi Mining District
Subdivisions of Georgia

References

External links 

Government of Adjara
Supreme Council of Adjara
Tourism & Resorts Department of Adjara
Georgian territories: Ajaria - BBC profile
Islam and Islamic Practices in Georgia
In pictures: Ajaria's 'velvet revolution' 2004

 
Former provinces of Georgia (country)
Historical regions of Georgia (country)
Autonomous republics of Georgia (country)
States and territories established in 1991